Omo Ghetto (English translation: Child of the Ghetto) is a 2010 Nigerian crime comedy drama film directed by Abiodun Olarenwaju, starring Funke Akindele, Rachel Oniga, Taiwo Hassan, Yinka Quadri and Eniola Badmus.

Plot
The film is based on the societal vices by a women-dominated gang. It showcases family, crime and sisterhood.

Reception
Olusegun Michael for Modern Ghana praised the plot, casting, theme and interpretation of roles in the film, describing it as a "didactic, entertaining and revealing" film. In 2017, Azeezat Kareem for Encomium Magazine listed Omo Ghetto as one of two films that brought Eniola Badmus to major limelight in the Nigerian film industry. It was also included in Legit.ng five "most memorable" films of Funke Akindele.

Cast
Funke Akindele as Lefty
Bimbo Thomas as Nicky
Rachel Oniga
Adebayo Salami as Baba Onibaba
Taiwo Hassan
Yinka Quadri
Eniola Badmus as Busty
Ronke Ojo

Release
The film had its premiere at the Exhibition Hall, National Arts Theatre, Iganmu on October 24, 2010.

Sequel 
The sequel of the film titled Omo Ghetto: The Saga was released on 25 December 2020.

See also
 List of Nigerian films

References

Nigerian crime comedy films
2010 films
Yoruba-language films
English-language Nigerian films
2010 comedy films
Nigerian comedy-drama films
Nigerian crime drama films